Sylvain Longchambon (born 30 July 1980) is a French ice dancer. With Caroline Truong, he won two silver medals on the 1999–2000 ISU Junior Grand Prix series, bronze at the 2001 Ondrej Nepela Memorial, and bronze at the 2002 French Championships.

Competitive highlights 
(with Truong for France)

GP: Grand Prix; JGP: Junior Grand Prix (Junior Series)

Programmes 
(with Truong)

Dancing on Ice
In 2011, Longchambon appeared in series 6 of ITV's Dancing on Ice, partnered with Jennifer Metcalfe. He withdrew from series 7 after tearing a tendon in his right biceps while training with partner Heidi Range. In 2013, he returned to Dancing On Ice partnered with Samia Ghadie. Ghadie and Longchambon became engaged in May 2015 and married in August 2016. Their son, Yves Joseph Longchambon, was born on 24 September 2015. Longchambon  returned to Dancing on Ice for its tenth series in January 2018, with celebrity partner Stephanie Waring and in 2019 with Jane Danson.

References 

Living people
1980 births
French male ice dancers
Competitors at the 2001 Winter Universiade